Gabriel Vázquez Saavedra y Rojas (1607–1664) was a Roman Catholic prelate who served as Bishop of Coria (1663–1664).

Biography
Gabriel Vázquez Saavedra y Rojas was born in Madrid, Spain in 1607. On 27 August 1663, he was appointed during the papacy of Pope Alexander VII as Bishop of Coria. He served as Bishop of Coria until his death in 1664.

References

External links and additional sources
 (for Chronology of Bishops) 
 (for Chronology of Bishops) 

17th-century Roman Catholic bishops in Spain
Bishops appointed by Pope Alexander VII
1607 births
1664 deaths